Aurantiacibacter arachoides is a Gram-negative and rod-shaped bacteria from the genus Aurantiacibacter which has been isolated from the ice core of the East Rongbuk Glacier from the Tibetan Plateau.

References 

Sphingomonadales
Bacteria described in 2017